Pennypacker Mills is a Colonial Revival mansion surrounded by  of farmland located in Perkiomen Township near Schwenksville, Pennsylvania on the shore of the Perkiomen Creek, approximately  northwest of Philadelphia.  Originally built around 1720 by Hans Jost Hite, it was purchased in 1747 by Peter Pennebacker, and remained privately owned by Pennypackers for eight generations.  In 1976, the house was added to the National Register of Historic Places.

During the American Revolutionary War, George Washington used Pennypacker Mills in the fall of 1777 as a headquarters prior to the Battle of Germantown, and also as a field hospital for injured soldiers after the battle.

Pennsylvania governor Samuel Pennypacker made the Mills his summer home in the early 1900s, and lived there for much of his term in office (1903–1907). After his term, he lived at the Mills year-round until his death in 1916.  He was an avid collector of antiques and manuscripts, and many of these can still be found on display at the Mills, along with letters and orders written by George Washington.

Pennypacker Mills is open to the public for tours Tuesday - Saturday from 10:00 am – 4:00 pm and Sunday 1:00 - 4:00 pm with the last daily tour at 3:30 pm.  Admission is free.  It also hosts special events such as Civil War reenactments on a regular basis.

References

External links

Pennypacker Mills visitors website
 A History of Schwenksville, including detailed history of Samuel and the Mills
 Montgomery County website, including a photographic tour of Pennypacker Mills.

Houses on the National Register of Historic Places in Pennsylvania
Pennsylvania culture
Historic house museums in Pennsylvania
Museums in Montgomery County, Pennsylvania
Houses in Montgomery County, Pennsylvania
Parks in Montgomery County, Pennsylvania
National Register of Historic Places in Montgomery County, Pennsylvania
Historic House Museums of the Pennsylvania Germans